The Women's pole vault at the 2010 Commonwealth Games as part of the athletics programme was held at the Jawaharlal Nehru Stadium on Tuesday 12 October 2010.

Records

Results

External links
2010 Commonwealth Games - Athletics

Women's pole vault
2010
2010 in women's athletics